Neill Molloy was an Anglican priest in Ireland in the seventeenth century.

Molloy was born in King's County, Ireland (now Offaly) and educated at Trinity College, Dublin. He was ordained in 1617 and became the incumbent at Fercall. He was Precentor of Kildare Cathedral from 1633 to 1639; and Archdeacon of Clonmacnoise  from 1638 to 1639.

References

Alumni of Trinity College Dublin
17th-century Irish Anglican priests
Archdeacons of Clonmacnoise
People from County Offaly